
Gmina Opoczno is an urban-rural gmina (administrative district) in Opoczno County, Łódź Voivodeship, in south-central Poland.

The gmina contains part of the protected area called Spała Landscape Park.

Villages
Apart from the town of Opoczno, Gmina Opoczno contains the villages and settlements of Adamów, Antoniów, Bielowice, Brzuśnia, Brzustówek, Brzustówek-Kolonia, Bukowiec Opoczyński, Dzielna, Janów Karwicki, Januszewice, Karwice, Kliny, Kraśnica, Kraszków, Kruszewiec, Kruszewiec PKP, Kruszewiec-Kolonia, Libiszów, Libiszów-Kolonia, Międzybórz, Modrzew, Modrzewek, Mroczków Gościnny, Ogonowice, Ostrów, Różanna, Sielec, Sitowa, Sobawiny, Stużno, Stużno-Kolonia, Wola Załężna, Wólka Karwicka, Wólka Karwicka-Kolonia, Wygnanów, Zameczek and Ziębów.

Neighbouring gminas
Gmina Opoczno is bordered by the gminas of Białaczów, Drzewica, Gielniów, Gowarczów, Inowłódz, Poświętne and Sławno.

References
Polish official population figures 2006

Opoczno
Opoczno County